QOOP was a web services company founded in Mill Valley, California in 2005.  They ran the website QOOP.com, which was presented as a 'social commerce network' for authors, artists, media archives and publishers.

QOOP.com 
The company and website closed down permanently in 2012.

This website provided tools for uploading documents and images, compiling them into calendars, books and other products, and printing the result. In addition to printing, users could use QOOP to create a store with listings of their digital content that they could share to friends and networks online.

Partners and services 
QOOP had grown through partnerships with sites for creators that allow them to quickly take their favorite works and turn them into cards, posters, and the like.  For instance they had an early partnership with Flickr, and later developed a Facebook app, to make it easy to print and ship photos from those sites.

QOOP also provided on-demand publishing services, and had partnered with publishers such as  CK-12 Foundation, Stanford University Press, and PLoS (Public Library of Science) to provide printing of textbooks and compendiums.

External links 
 An early review by Kottke on using QOOP to print his Flickr photos
 Press release about the website, March 2009

References 

American printers
Defunct websites
Defunct companies based in California